State Route 171 (SR 171) is a  state highway that runs south-to-north through portions of Treutlen, Emanuel, Johnson, Jefferson, Glascock, and Warren counties in the east-central part of the U.S. state of Georgia.

Route description
SR 171 begins at an intersection with US 221/SR 56, northeast of Soperton, in Treutlen County. US 221/SR 171 run concurrent for just over half of SR 171's length. A little ways north of that point, the two highways cross into Emanuel County and then, the Ohoopee River. They meet US 80/SR 26. They curve to the northwest, then curve back to the northeast. After a brief entrance into Johnson County, and a longer re-entrance to Emanuel County, the concurrency enters Johnson County again. They continue to the northeast and then curve to the northwest to the town of Kite, where they meet SR 57. They continue to the north and begin a gradual curve to the northeast to enter Jefferson County. The routes meet US 319/SR 78, which join the concurrency. Just before entering Bartow, they intersect SR 242. In town, US 319/SR 78 depart to the east. US 221/SR 171 continue to the north, until they meet SR 24, which joins the concurrency. The three highways head to the northeast until a point just southwest of Louisville. There, SR 171 departs to the northwest. Farther to the northwest is SR 88 (Jefferson Davis Memorial Highway) and SR 540 (Fall Line Freeway). It continues to the northwest to enter Glascock County. It curves to the northeast, until it enters the town of Gibson. There, it meets SR 102. The road heads north and curves to the northwest to enter Warren County. SR 171 continues to the northwest until it meets its northern terminus, an intersection with US 278 Bypass/SR 12 Bypass, in Warrenton.

Major intersections

See also

References

External links

 Georgia Roads (Routes 161 - 180)

171
Transportation in Treutlen County, Georgia
Transportation in Emanuel County, Georgia
Transportation in Johnson County, Georgia
Transportation in Jefferson County, Georgia
Transportation in Glascock County, Georgia
Transportation in Warren County, Georgia